Sachindra Lal Singh (7 August 1907 – 9 December 2000) was a leader of the Indian National Congress and the first Chief Minister of Tripura state in northeastern India from 1 July 1963 to 1 November 1971. In 1977, he became the leader of the newly formed Congress for Democracy party. He was elected to the sixth Lok Sabha from Tripura West constituency as a member of the congress for Democracy.Sachindralal Singh, the first Chief Minister of Tripura, was a highly popular leader of Tripura. He was fondly called “Sachin-da” and was highly admired for his simplicity and amiable nature.

Family and early life
His father, Shri Deen Dayal Singh who hailed from Kashi (Varanasi), served major role in the military establishment of the Kingdom of Tripura and settled at Agartala permanently. Sachin-da passed his academic term from Victoria College (British India).  Sachin-da started his political activities from his school days as a member of “Bhatri Sangh”, an organisation of youths of Agartala. The members of the Sangh had political link with the Jugantar Party of Bengal from the year 1920 or there about.

Struggle for Indian independence (1924–1947)

There was no Congress organisation in the Princely States before India achieved independence. An organisation in the name of Gana Parishad used to work in Hill Tripura as a substitute of Congress. It may be noted that in the pre-independent India Princely Tripura was known as “Hill Tripura” and there was also a Tipperah District of the then Bengal province adjacent to it. The people of Hill Tripura were also involved in freedom movement of the country and had close relations with their counterparts in British India. There was, however, no political agitation against the Maharaja of Tripura.

Career
From 1946 Sachin-da extensively toured the Hills and dales of Tripura for organisational work. He had special love and care for the hills’ people. Sometime in 1950 he organised a Tribal Conference, inviting tribal leaders from all parts of Tripura at village Bagafa in Belonia sub-division, which was inaugurated by the then Chief Commissioner, Mr. K K Hazra, ICS. About 200 Tribal people attended the conference.
Deeply impressed and influenced by Mahatma Gandhi, he became a loyal follower, first of Gandhi, and then of Jawaharlal Nehru. Following independence in 1947
In 1953, at Sachin-da’s initiative, Tribal rehabilitation work (1st in Tripura) started at Bagafa with financial support from the Prime Minister’s Fund. In 1953, while he was an advisor to the Advisory Council of the Government of Tripura, Tripura welfare work was taken up by the Government. A Special Officer for Tribal Welfare was appointed and necessary fund allotted for the purpose. When he became the 1st Chief Minister of Tripura, he made special endeavour to upgrade the Tribal Welfare Office and give more attention to Tribal Jhumia Settlement and other tribal welfare work.

In the General Election held in 1952 he was elected as a Member of Tripura Electoral College. In 1956 he was elected as a Member of Tripura Territorial Council and became its 1st Chairman. He was elected as a member of Tripura Territorial Council for the 2nd time in 1967, which was subsequently converted into a Territorial Assembly to form the 1st government in Tripura. He was elected leader of the Congress party which was in majority in the Territorial Assembly, and formed the first democratically elected government in Tripura.

In the Government as an Advisor, as Chairman of the Territorial Council and as Chief Minister he worked with great devotion for the development of Tripura in agriculture, education, road communication and welfare of the people in general and Scheduled Tribes, Scheduled Castes and OBC in particular. He took care of the refugees from East Pakistan for their rehabilitation. It was due to his endeavour that a large number of refugees got rehabilitated. Sachin-da is rightly called the architect of democratic Tripura.
He was a Founder member of Bangladesh and in 1971, when he was a Chief Minister of Tripura, giving all the support and help to his fast friend Sheikh mujibur Rahman and peoples of Bangladesh.

He was the 1st Chairman of Tripura Khadi & Village Industries Board, the Harijan Sevak Sangh, Tripura Board, Kamraj Foundation, New Delhi and Chairman of Freedom Fighters Committee of the Ministry of Home Affairs Government of India, Mamber of Telecommunication Committee etc.

Later life and death
In the last phase of his life, the circumstances compelled him to leave the Tripura State Congress which he had formed, and he joined the “Congress For Democracy” of Babu Jagjiwan Ram. In 1972 General Election he was elected Member of the Lok Sabha from Tripura West Parliamentary Constituency as a candidate of Congress for Democracy (apart from Indira Gandhi). but in 1982 Prime Minister Rajiv Gandhi invite him in family, and  he joined Indian National Congress again, 
1982, He was a Chairman of Election Committee, Tripura Pradesh Congress Committee, and in charge of North Eastern states. He was close with H.N. Bahuguna, Smt. Nandini Satpathy, Santosh Mohan Dev, Gopinath Bardoloi, K. Kamraaj, Dr. B.C. Roy, Mohan Lal Sukhadiya etc.

Since 1977 he was living in New Delhi with his wife and children (Ashish Lal Singh, Nandita Singh, Debashish Lal Singh, Namita Singh), and died there on 9 December 2000. His body was brought to Agartala by the Government and cremated at Dashami Ghat cremation ground, Agartala, with full State Honour. He was awarded "Friends of Liberation War Honour" posthumously in 2012 from Bangladesh for his outstanding contributions in the Bangladesh Liberation War.

Notes

External links
 Official biographical sketch in Parliament of India website

1907 births
2000 deaths
Chief Ministers of Tripura
India MPs 1977–1979
Lok Sabha members from Tripura
People from West Tripura district
Chief ministers from Indian National Congress
Tripura MLAs 1967–1972
Indian National Congress politicians
Tripura politicians
Comilla Victoria Government College alumni
Janata Party politicians
Congress for Democracy politicians
People of the Bangladesh Liberation War